Ložnica is a settlement in the Municipality of Velenje in northern Slovenia. It lies in the Ložnica Hills south of Velenje. The area is part of the traditional region of Styria. The entire municipality is now included in the Savinja Statistical Region.

References

External links
Ložnica at Geopedia

Populated places in the City Municipality of Velenje